Quelli che soffrono per voi is a 1951 Italian short documentary film directed by Alessandro Blasetti.

External links
 

1951 films
1950s Italian-language films
Italian documentary films
1951 documentary films
1950s Italian films